Piranha is the fifth single in Japanese by South Korean girl group The Grace. It was released on August 1, 2007 by Rhythm Zone in both CD and CD+DVD (Limited Edition) versions. The single was consists of the lead single "Piranha", the Japanese version of "My Everything", "One More Time, OK?" and remix version of "The Club".  It ranked #50 on the Oricon charts and charted for two weeks, selling 2,920 copies in Japan.

Track listing

CD Only
 "Piranha"
 "My Everything"
 "Just for One Day" feat.Jejung from 東方神起
 "The Club "STY Gin n' Tonic Remix"" feat.Seamo (Limited Edition)
 "Piranha" (Instrumental)
 "My Everything" (Instrumental)
 "Just for One Day" (Instrumental with Jejung)
 "Just for One Day" (Instrumental with 天上智喜)

CD+DVD

CD Portion
 "Piranha"
 "My Everything"
 "Just for One Day" feat. Jejung from 東方神起
 "The Club "STY Gin n' Tonic Remix"" feat. Seamo (Limited Edition)
 "Piranha" (Instrumental)
 "My Everything" (Instrumental)
 "Just for One Day" (Instrumental with Jejung)
 "Just for One Day" (Instrumental with 天上智喜)

DVD Portion
 "Piranha" Music video

External links
  Official Website

2006 singles
The Grace (band) songs